Bukom Square is a place, associated with the "Ga" people,  located in Ghana, in the heart of Accra, the capital.

Bukom is known for its output of successful boxers to America. A large proportion of these boxers settle in the Bronx, New York City, primarily because of its high Ghanaian population.

Some notable boxers to come out of Bukom include Azumah Nelson, Bukom Banku, Ike Quartey and Kwame Asante, as well as welterweight Joshua Clottey, who won the IBF title by defeating Zab Judah in August 2008. He eventually lost the title in his mandatory defense against Miguel Cotto.

Kpanlogo, Gome, Kolomashie and now the famous Azonto among other notable dances peculiar to the Ga's can be found here. Due to its location (near the coast), inhabitants of Bukom are mainly fishermen and fishmongers, with kenkey and fried fish with fried pepper and spices normally called black pepper or shito.

Bukom is also the hub of cultural activities and has many cultural troupes scattered around. Youths whose hobbies include dancing pride themselves in belonging to one cultural troupe or another. Bukom is also a hive of activities at weekends. Many become involved in Ghanaian traditional drumming and dancing full-time. You can see youth scattered across drinking spots or attending funerals or weddings on Fridays, Saturdays and Sundays.

References

Populated places in the Greater Accra Region